William James Alexander Weir,  (born 4 April 1891) was an Australian flying ace of the First World War credited with six aerial victories. He received the Distinguished Flying Cross for "conspicuous gallantry in air combats and attacking ground objectives".

Sources of information

1891 births
Australian Flying Corps officers
Australian recipients of the Distinguished Flying Cross (United Kingdom)
Australian World War I flying aces
People from the Inner West (Sydney)
Year of death missing